Justice League: Original Motion Picture Soundtrack is the soundtrack to the film of the same name composed by Danny Elfman. It was released on November 10, 2017, by WaterTower Music, while the physical edition was released on December 8 by WaterTower. Most of the material used in  Elfman's soundtrack was disregarded by Tom Holkenborg (whom Elfman replaced as composer for the film's 2017 theatrical cut) when he returned to score the 2021 director's cut of the film.

The score received mixed reception from critics and fans alike. While some praised its orchestral sound and use of Elfman's original Batman theme others thought the score was derivative of Elfman's previous scores and too much of a departure from previous DCEU scores.

Track listing

Charts

References

External links
 Official site

2017 soundtrack albums
2010s film soundtrack albums
Film scores
Danny Elfman soundtracks
WaterTower Music soundtracks
DC Extended Universe soundtracks
Superhero film soundtracks
Justice League (film)